was a town located in Saga District, Saga Prefecture, Japan. The status of Higashiyoka was changed from a village to a town on October 1, 1966.

As of 2003, the town had an estimated population of 7,621 and a density of 495.19 persons per km2. The total area was 15.39 km2.

On October 1, 2007, Higashiyoka, along with the towns of Kawasoe and Kubota (all from Saga District), was merged into the expanded city of Saga.

Dissolved municipalities of Saga Prefecture